Stephen T. Vacendak (born August 15, 1944) is an American former basketball player and coach.  He originally came from Scranton, Pennsylvania, and was recruited by Vic Bubas to play as a guard for the Duke Blue Devils men's basketball team.  As a guard for the team he led Duke to a 72–14 record and two Final Four appearances during his three-year varsity career.  In 1966 he was captain of his basketball team, ACC Player of the Year, and on the All-ACC Tournament team. Despite being named player of the year, Vacendak was not named to the All-ACC team in 1966.

Early career

After graduating from Duke University, he was drafted by the San Francisco Warriors in the fourth round of the 1966 NBA draft, but he never played for them. Instead, he played professional basketball for the American Basketball Association and later joined the sales staff at Converse Rubber Company.  In 1980, he went back to work at Duke as an associate athletic director for five years.  Perhaps his most significant contribution to his alma mater came during this period when he strongly recommended an unknown young coach at Army – Mike Krzyzewski or Coach K – for the Duke head coaching job. Ironically, Vacendak also played a big role in recommending that NC State consider Jim Valvano for their open head coaching job and State hired Jimmy V just nine days after Duke hired Coach K.   After working at Duke, he became the director of athletics and head basketball coach at Winthrop College in Rock Hill, South Carolina.

Career
Following his stint at Winthrop, Vacendak spent three years working at Homeowners Clubs of America, a franchising company in Charlotte, North Carolina.  He later became a partner in Damon's Restaurant in Raleigh, N.C., a position which ultimately (through a customer at Damon's) connected him with the organization with which he has been involved ever since: N.C. Beautiful.

Other projects
Vacendak currently serves as the Executive Director for N.C. Beautiful, which is a private, non-profit organization dedicated to preserving the natural beauty of North Carolina "through environmental education and outreach." More specifically, the group provides grants to teachers to sponsor environmentally-based projects in their classrooms and helps college undergraduate and graduate students get involved in environmental research.

References

External links

 Stephen T. Vacendak bio at Duke Athletics
 College stats at Sports Reference
 Professional stats at Basketball Reference
 Coaching stats at Sports Reference

1944 births
Living people
American men's basketball players
Basketball coaches from Pennsylvania
Basketball players from Pennsylvania
College men's basketball head coaches in the United States
Duke Blue Devils men's basketball players
Greensboro Pride men's basketball coaches
Minnesota Pipers players
Miami Floridians players
Pittsburgh Pipers players
Point guards
San Francisco Warriors draft picks
Sportspeople from Scranton, Pennsylvania
Winthrop Eagles athletic directors
Winthrop Eagles men's basketball coaches